Pivkovice is a municipality and village in Strakonice District in the South Bohemian Region of the Czech Republic. It has about 90 inhabitants.

Administrative parts
The village of Chrást in an administrative part of Pivkovice.

References

Villages in Strakonice District